Bitter Creek may refer to:

Bitter Creek, Texas, a ghost town in Nolan County
Bitter Creek (South Dakota)
Bitter Creek (Utah), a tributary of the White River
Bitter Creek (Wyoming), a tributary of the Green River
Bitter Creek National Wildlife Refuge, in Kern County, California
 Bitter Creek (film), a 1954 American Western film
 Bitter Creek, a song from the Eagles' album Desperado